Mollicutes is a class of bacteria distinguished by the absence of a cell wall. The word "Mollicutes" is derived from the Latin mollis (meaning "soft" or "pliable"), and cutis (meaning "skin"). Individuals are very small, typically only 0.2–0.3 μm (200–300 nm) in size and have a very small genome size. They vary in form, although most have sterols that make the cell membrane somewhat more rigid. Many are able to move about through gliding, but members of the genus Spiroplasma are helical and move by twisting. The best-known genus in the Mollicutes is Mycoplasma. Colonies show the typical "fried-egg" appearance.

Mollicutes are parasites of various animals and plants, living on or in the host's cells. Many cause diseases in humans, attaching to cells in the respiratory or urogenital tracts, particularly species of Mycoplasma and Ureaplasma.  Phytoplasma and Spiroplasma are plant pathogens associated with insect vectors.

Whereas formerly the trivial name "mycoplasma" (plural: "mycoplasmas") has commonly denoted any member of the class Mollicutes, it now in scientific classification refers exclusively to a member of the genus Mycoplasma.

Origin and development to parasitic life
Analysis of the genomes of Mollicutes ("mycoplasmas") gives solid support for the hypothesis that Mollicutes have developed from Gram-positive bacteria by a process of reductive evolution. By adopting a parasitic mode of life with use of nutrients from their hosts, many Mollicutes were able to reduce their genetic material considerably. On the other hand, they lost the genes for many assimilative processes. Thus, Mycoplasma possibly became the smallest self-replicating organism in nature. Mycoplasma genitalium, with 580,000 base pairs, has an especially small genome size. Some phytoplasmas also have a very small genome size. The genera with the smallest genome are considered to be phylogenetically the most "recent" mollicutes.

To maintain their parasitic mode of life the Mollicutes have developed rather sophisticated mechanisms to colonize their hosts and resist the host immune system.

Proliferation
Mollicutes (formerly also called pleuropneumonia-like organisms, PPLO) as well as L-form bacteria (formerly also called L-phase bacteria), both lacking cell walls, do not proliferate by binary fission but by a budding mechanism. In 1954, this mode of proliferation has been shown by continual observations of live cells using phase-contrast microscopy. 

Previously, Mollicutes were sometimes considered stable L-form bacteria, but phylogenetic analysis has identified them as bacteria that have lost their cell walls in the course of evolution.

History of the classification
The classification of the Mollicutes has always been difficult. The individuals are tiny, and being parasites, they have to be cultivated on special media. Until now, many species could not be isolated at all. In the beginning, whether they were fungi, viruses, or bacteria was not clear. Also, the resemblance to L-forms was confusing.  At first, all members of the class Mollicutes were generally named "mycoplasma" or pleuropneumonia-like organism (PPLO). Mollicutes other than some members of genus Mycoplasma were still unidentified.  The first species of Mycoplasma/Mollicutes, that could be isolated was Mycoplasma mycoides. This bacterium was cultivated by Nocard and Roux in 1898.

In 1956, D.G. Edward and E.A. Freundt made a first proposal for classifying and naming PPLOs. They left undecided, however, whether they belong to the bacteria (prokaryotes, in 1956 called "Schizomycetes") or to the eukaryotes. As type species (name-giving species) of the PPLOs/mycoplasmas, Edward and Freundt proposed Mycoplasma mycoides, being the causative organism of bovine pleuropneumonia and referring to the pleuropneumonia-like organisms. Until then, Mycoplasma mycoides was known as Asterococcus mycoides, but later that name was not recognized as valid. In their publication of 1956, they described 15 species of Mycoplasma. In 1967 the class Mollicutes, containing the order Mycoplasmatales, was proposed by the Subcommittee on Taxonomy of the Mycoplasmata. Now, the name Mycoplasma should exclusively be used for members of the genus Mycoplasma, rather than the use as a trivial name for any Mollicute. As the trivial name has been used in literature for a long time, this is yet not always the case.

Three divisions of the Bacteria

Traditionally, the taxonomy of bacteria was based on similarities and differences in morphology (Linnaean taxonomy).

In 1962, R.G.E. Murray proposed to divide the "kingdom" (now domain) Bacteria into three divisions (= phyla) on the basis of the cell wall types:
 Gram-negative Gracilicutes, with a thin cell wall and little peptidoglycan;
 Gram-positive "Firmacutes", with a thicker cell wall and more peptidoglycan (the name was later changed in "Firmicutes"), and
 the "Mollicutes", without a cell wall.

Phylogeny

For classification and nomenclature of Mollicutes, there are special rules, which are maintained by the International Committee on Systematics of Prokaryotes (ICSP) Subcommittee on the Taxonomy of Mollicutes (formerly the International Committee on Systematic Bacteriology (ICSB) Subcommittee on taxonomy of Mycoplasmatales).

Traditionally, Mollicutes taxonomy has been based on serology and phenotypic characteristics. However, most modern classifications are based on DNA or RNA sequences, especially 16S rRNA sequences (see Figure).

The phylum for Mollicutes
The results of Mollicutes phylogenetic analyses have been controversial. Some taxonomists place them in Bacillota, others in Mycoplasmatota. Woese et al. suggested that the Mollicutes might have been derived from different branches of bacteria. They concluded, that the Mollicutes are not a phylogenetically coherent group and therefore do not form a distinct higher level taxon. Instead, they cluster within Gram-positive bacteria of the phylum Bacillota. The results of molecular phylogenetic analyses have been partly dependent on the chosen molecular marker, like rRNA, elongation factor or another protein. Phylogenetic trees based on phosphoglycerate kinase (Pgk) amino acid sequences' indicated a monophyletic origin for the Mollicutes within the Bacillota.

An early edition of Bergey's Manual of Systematic Bacteriology placed class Mollicutes within phylum Bacillota, whereas in the announced 2nd edition, they are moved to a separate phylum Tenericutes (later renamed Mycoplasmatota). The change is motivated by "their unique phenotypic properties, in particular the lack of rigid cell walls, and the general low support by alternative markers". In the Taxonomic Outline of Bacteria and Archaea (TOBA Release 7.7), March 2007, the Mollicutes are a class in the phylum Bacillota.

The currently accepted taxonomy is based on the List of Prokaryotic names with Standing in Nomenclature (LPSN) and National Center for Biotechnology Information (NCBI)

♦ Paraphyletic Mollicutes

See also
 List of bacterial orders
 List of bacteria genera

References

External links

 
Bacteria classes